Rainstorm Entertainment is an independent film development, production and sales company headquartered in Hollywood, California.

History
Rainstorm Entertainment was confirmed in November 2003 to produce and finance the documentary film Fuck, with production scheduled to begin in January 2004. The film was completed in 2005 by film director Steve Anderson's film company Mudflap Films; it was executive produced by Rainstorm Entertainment co-founders Steven Kaplan and Gregg Daniel, along with Bruce Leiserowitz, Jory Weitz and Richard Ardi.

Filmography

References

External links
Official Rainstorm Entertainment site
Official Rainstorm Music site

Film production companies of the United States